The 2010 Gent–Wevelgem cycle road race took place on March 28, 2010. It was the 72nd edition of the international top classic Gent–Wevelgem. The final of Gent–Wevelgem was largely redrawn. An extra track was added in France, with a double passage over Mont des Cats and Mont Noir. The race was the sixth event in the UCI World Ranking.

Bernhard Eisel (AUT) beat Sep Vanmarcke of Belgium in a six-way sprint to the finish to win the Ghent-Wevelgem cycling classic. One of the pre-race favourites Philippe Gilbert finished third ahead of American veteran George Hincapie. The other pre-race favourites Tom Boonen and Fabian Cancellara both dropped out in the middle of the race. Eisel commented after the race, "Until now I never liked this race. The wind and all is not my thing. But from this day on Gent–Wevelgem is going to become my great love."

Teams

There were 25 teams in the 2010 Gent–Wevelgem. They were:

ProTour Teams

Wild Cards

Results

See also 
 2010 in Road Cycling

References 

Gent–Wevelgem
2010 in Belgian sport
2010 UCI ProTour
2010 UCI World Ranking